Your Hit Parade was an American radio and television music program that was broadcast from 1935 to 1953 on radio, and seen from 1950 to 1959 on television. In 1935, they began publishing the earliest weekly music chart, preceding the Billboard singles chart, which was updated weekly by the Billboard magazine beginning on July 27, 1940.

The Your Hit Parade chart was established in April 1935, which operated under a proprietary formula to determine the popularity of a song based on five factors, including 1) record sales (divided between a) retail and b) wholesale), 2) sheet-music copies of the song (both retail and wholesale), 3) number of radio plays, a category that is sub-divided between a) plays on the three national networks and b) plays on local stations, 4) plays on Juke-boxes, and 5) numbers of requests to orchestra leaders to play a particular song. As such, though the musicians who popularized each song are credited with having done so, this is not exactly the same as them having made a hit record.

Number ones

Statistical trivia

By artist 
The following artists achieved five or more number-one hits during the period 1935–1940. A number of artists had number-one singles on their own as well as part of a collaboration.

† Includes 2 number-one hits co-leading The Dorsey Brothers

Artists by total number of weeks at number one 
The following artists were featured in top of the chart for the highest total number of weeks during 1935–1940.

† Includes 2 number-one hits co-leading The Dorsey Brothers

Songs by total number of weeks at number one 
The following songs were featured in top of the chart for the highest total number of weeks during 1935–1940.

See also
 List of Billboard number-one singles
 1930s in music

References

Your Hit Parade
1930s in American music
United States Your Hit Parade